Halgerda bacalusia is a species of sea slug, a dorid nudibranch, shell-less marine gastropod mollusks in the family Discodorididae.

Distribution
This species was described from Richelieu Rock, Andaman Sea, Thailand.

References

Discodorididae
Gastropods described in 1999